Marko Popović (born 12 June 1982) is a Croatian basketball executive and former professional basketball player. He currently serves as a sporting director for Zenit Saint Petersburg of the VTB United League and the EuroLeague.

Early life 
Born in Zadar, Popović is the son of Petar, a retired basketball player and present-day coach. Marko started training in basketball in the youth school of KK Zadar, in 1991, but his family moved to Zagreb in 1994, when the father signed with Benston. Popović then entered the youth system of Cibona, where he remained until 1997, when his family moved back to Zadar. Popović's cadet team won the national championship, and he was voted the MVP of the tournament.

College career 
After Popović had a successful 2000 FIBA Europe Under-18 Championship with Croatia's junior national team, KK Zadar decided to offer him a seven-year contract, but he declined the offer, and instead went to an NCAA Division II college basketball team in the United States. He joined the College of Southern Idaho, where he stayed for a year.

Professional career 
Popović played with the youth junior squad of KK Zadar in the 1998–99 season, and also played in three games with the club's senior team that season. In the club's youth squad, he scored an average of 25 points per game, which earned him a spot in the top-tier level senior men's team of the club in the following season of 1999–00. After spending a year in the United States, playing college basketball at the College of Southern Idaho (NCAA Division II), he moved back to Zadar, Croatia, in 2001.

In the 2002–03 ABA League season, Zadar surprisingly won the championship, after beating Maccabi Tel Aviv in the finals. Popović played a major role in his team's success, and he was awarded with the MVP title of the leagues' final four tournament, which took place in Ljubljana.

In 2003 he moved to Pamesa Valencia of the Spanish ACB League for the 2003–04 season, where he stayed until February 2004, before moving back to Croatia again, this time to Cibona, with which he won the Croatian League championship in the 2003–04 season.

In 2005 Popović was signed by Turkish League team Efes Pilsen, and the next year, he moved to Žalgiris Kaunas of the Lithuanian League, with which he won both the 2006–07 and 2007–08 Lithuanian league championships. While playing with UNICS Kazan, he was named the Finals MVP of the 2nd-tier level European-wide league, the EuroCup, in 2011.

In 2011 he returned to Žalgiris. After leaving Žalgiris in June 2013, Popović agreed to contract terms with the Russian VTB United League team Khimki Moscow Region, as he signed a two-year deal with the club on 7 August 2013. On 16 June 2015, he left Khimki, after spending two seasons with the club.

On 6 October 2015, he signed with the Spanish team Baloncesto Fuenlabrada. In February 2017, he became the all-time EuroCup scoring leader, but was surpassed by Bojan Dubljević and Rafa Martínez later same season. On 17 July 2018, he resigned with the Spanish club. After spending four seasons with Fuenlabrada, in May 2019 Popović announced he will retire from playing professional basketball at the end of the season.

National team career 
Popović played for the Croatian men's junior national teams. With Croatia's under-18 team, he won a silver medal at the 2000 European Championship, which was held in his home town of Zadar. Croatia lost that tournament's gold medal game by one point against the junior national team of France, which was led by Tony Parker. Popović led the tournament in assists, with an average of 5.2 assists per game. He also led the 2002 FIBA Europe Under-20 Championship in both scoring and assists.

Popović joined the senior men's Croatian national team in 2002, and with the senior team, he played at the following EuroBasket tournaments: in 2003, 2005, 2007, 2009, 2011, and finally in 2017. He also played at the 2008 Summer Olympics and at the 2010 World Championship.

Career statistics

EuroLeague 

|-
| style="text-align:left;"| 2001–02
| style="text-align:left;"| Zadar
| 11 || 4 || 30.4 || .402 || .299 || .813 || 1.8 || 4.0 || 1.6 || .0 || 13.9 || 13.1
|-
| style="text-align:left;"| 2003–04
| style="text-align:left;"| Valencia
| 17 || 5 || 20.0 || .363 || .339 || .767 || 2.2 || 1.8 || 1.1 || .0 || 6.8 || 6.5
|-
| style="text-align:left;"| 2004–05
| style="text-align:left;"| Cibona
| 17 || 16 || 31.8 || .449 || .386 || .733 || 2.2 || 4.0 || 1.9 || .0 || 15.4 || 16.2
|-
| style="text-align:left;"| 2005–06
| style="text-align:left;"| Efes Pilsen
| 16 || 13 || 24.0 || .478 || .419 || .776 || 1.4 || 3.1 || 1.4 || .0 || 12.9 || 12.8
|-
| style="text-align:left;"| 2006–07
| style="text-align:left;"| Žalgiris
| 7 || 7 || 34.4 || .395 || .273 || .909 || .9 || 4.9 || 1.4 || .0 || 15.1 || 15.9
|-
| style="text-align:left;"| 2007–08
| style="text-align:left;"| Žalgiris
| 20 || 0 || 21.5 || .432 || .396 || .839 || 1.4 || 2.0 || 1.0 || .0 || 11.7 || 10.3
|-
| style="text-align:left;"| 2011–12
| style="text-align:left;"| Žalgiris
| 14 || 1 || 22.2 || .404 || .387 || .906 || 2.1 || 2.1 || .4 || .0 || 12.5 || 11.4
|-
| style="text-align:left;"| 2012–13
| style="text-align:left;"| Žalgiris
| 21 || 13 || 24.0 || .486 || .439 || .855 || 1.4 || 2.2 || .7 || .0 || 13.4 || 12.5
|- class="sortbottom"
| style="text-align:left;"| Career
| style="text-align:left;"|
| 123 || 59 || 29.2 || .434 || .380 || .821 || 1.7 || 2.8 || 1.2 || .0 || 12.5 || 12.0

References

External links 

Marko Popović at acb.com 
Marko Popović at basketball-reference.com
Marko Popović at bgbasket.com
Marko Popović at eurobasket.com
Marko Popović at euroleague.net
Marko Popović at fiba.com
Marko Popović at fiba.com (game center)
Marko Popović at fibaeurope.com
Marko Popović at pbleague.net

1982 births
Living people
2010 FIBA World Championship players
ABA League players
Anadolu Efes S.K. players
Baloncesto Fuenlabrada players
Basketball players at the 2008 Summer Olympics
Basketball players from Zadar
BC Khimki players
BC UNICS players
BC Žalgiris players
Croatian expatriate basketball people in Lithuania
Croatian expatriate basketball people in Russia
Croatian expatriate basketball people in Spain
Croatian expatriate basketball people in Turkey
Croatian expatriate basketball people in the United States
Croatian men's basketball players
Croatian people of Serbian descent
KK Cibona players
KK Zadar players
Liga ACB players
Olympic basketball players of Croatia
Point guards
Shooting guards
Southern Idaho Golden Eagles men's basketball players
Valencia Basket players